Monte Talvena is a mountain of the Dolomites in Veneto, Italy. It has an elevation of 2,542 metres.

References

Mountains of the Alps
Dolomites
Mountains of Veneto